A dydoe is a type of male genital body piercing that passes through the ridge of the glans on the head of the penis. They are often done in pairs. Less often, a "king's crown" is where several dydoes are placed around the head of the penis. The jewelry is usually a 12 gauge, straight barbell with a ball on either end, although a ring may be used at a higher chance of rejection. A deep dydoe (also known as "Zephyr") is one that uses a longer barbell and exits near the tip of the penis.

Etymology
The word dydoe is thought to come from the word 'doodad', which means 'a decorative embellishment', as it can be visually attractive to some.

Procedure

The procedure is usually done using a straight way the ridge is formed usually dictates that the piercing be performed freehand. Healing time is around 4–6 months and abstinence is advised for the first two weeks. The piercing should be cleaned daily with a sterile saline solution [neilmed] and a condom is recommended during penile intercourse until it fully heals. The jewelry can be changed after a period of time, but it is not recommended to have it out for very long, as even when healed, the hole tends to quickly close and the pain in replacing it can be more than the actual piercing. The glans of the penis is a very vascular area and healing can be very quick, in a matter of hours. If it hasn't fully healed back and there is difficulty replacing it, a professional piercer may be able to use a taper (a blunt, rounded needle) to re-open the hole. If it is permanently removed it will probably leave a small scar.

The dydoe is generally considered to be one of the most painful of piercings, as it goes through the glans of the penis. Bleeding is normal and very likely. Because the ridge of the glans must be large enough to accommodate the needle and jewelry it is a piercing that depends on the anatomy of the individual and should be done by a professional piercer. It is usually performed on circumcised males, as the presence of a tight foreskin keeps the area moist and inhibits healing.

Effects
Speculation has been made that it enhances sexual feeling that has been lost due to circumcision. The reason for this is the added pressure of the jewelry on the glans during intercourse, which may also lead to quicker ejaculations in some sexual positions. During vaginal intercourse, the piercing usually results in greater stimulation for the partner. A centrally placed dydoe works especially well in stimulating the g-spot, as the ball at the head is placed near to where the top ball of an apadravya would be placed. An apadravya is generally considered the most pleasurable piercing for partners during vaginal intercourse.

Weblinks 

 http://www.dydoe.net/

References

Penis piercings